Harmony was a Dutch pop band of the 1970s. The group represented the Netherlands in the Eurovision Song Contest 1978 in Paris. There the band performed the song 't Is OK and ended in the 13th place with 37 points (20 entries).

Harmony consisted of Rosina Louwaars, Donald Lieveld and Ab van Woudenberg.

External links 
Information and images about the band

Eurovision Song Contest entrants for the Netherlands
Eurovision Song Contest entrants of 1978
Dutch pop music groups
Nationaal Songfestival contestants